Kay Carberry,  (born 19 October 1950) is the former Assistant General Secretary of the British Trades Union Congress (TUC).

Carberry studied at the Royal Naval School Tal-Handaq in Malta, then at the University of Sussex.  She worked as a teacher for three years, and became active in the National Union of Teachers (NUT), where she took employment as a researcher.  She began working for the TUC in 1978, and in 1988 was appointed as the first head of its Equal Rights Department.  In 2003, she was appointed to the vacant post of Assistant General Secretary of the TUC.

Carberry has held a number of other posts.  She was a commissioner on the Equality and Human Rights Commission, and the Equal Opportunities Commission. She is a commissioner of the Low Pay Commission, a board member of Transport for London, a trustee of the People's History Museum, a director of TU Fund Managers, an alternate member of The Takeover Panel and an honorary fellow of St Hugh’s College Oxford.

In 2007, Carberry was appointed a CBE.  She retired from the TUC in 2016.

References

|-

1950 births
Living people
Alumni of the University of Sussex
Commanders of the Order of the British Empire
British trade union leaders
Women trade unionists